Major General David Malcolm Howell, CB, OBE is a barrister and retired British Army officer who was, until January 2011, Director General, Army Legal Services.

Military career
He was appointed Officer of the Order of the British Empire in 1991, having served in Northern Ireland and Companion of the Order of the Bath in the 2006 Queen's Birthday Honours.

He was promoted to captain on 9 June 1975 and transferred from a short-service to a regular commission on 25 February 1977, retaining the rank of captain with seniority from 9 June 1975. He was promoted to major in 1982 and resigned his commission later the same year, but was reinstated on 12 March 1984, with seniority from 22 September 1983. He was promoted to lieutenant colonel in 1988. He served in Iraq during the Gulf War in 1991 and promoted to colonel on 30 June 1998, with seniority from the same date, and to brigadier in 2001.

He was appointed Director General, Army Legal Services in 2003—a position he held until his retirement on 28 January 2011.

References

British Army major generals
Companions of the Order of the Bath
Officers of the Order of the British Empire
Army Legal Corps officers
British Army personnel of the Gulf War
Living people
Year of birth missing (living people)